Germanic religion  may refer to:

 Germanic paganism
 Germanic Christianity
 Heathenry (new religious movement)
 Neopaganism in German-speaking Europe

External links